Brandon Marico King (born January 28, 1987) is a former American football cornerback. He was signed by the Indianapolis Colts as an undrafted free agent in 2010. He played college football at Purdue.

He was also a member of the Miami Dolphins, Jacksonville Jaguars and Detroit Lions.

Professional career

Indianapolis Colts
After going undrafted in the 2010 NFL Draft, King signed as a free agent with the Indianapolis Colts on April 30, 2010. He played in 4 games before being placed on injured reserve on October 20, 2010. He was waived on September 3, 2011.

Miami Dolphins
On September 13, 2011, he was signed to the Miami Dolphins' practice squad.

Indianapolis Colts
He signed back with the Colts on December 6, 2011 and played in four games for the Colts in 2011.

Jacksonville Jaguars
King was signed to the Jacksonville Jaguars' practice squad on November 15, 2012. He was signed to the active roster at the conclusion of the 2012 season. He was released on February 27, 2013.

Detroit Lions
On August 5, 2013, King was signed by the Detroit Lions. On August 13, 2013, he was released by the Lions.

References

External links
 Purdue Boilermakers bio
 Indianapolis Colts bio
 Miami Dolphins bio
 Jacksonville Jaguars bio

1987 births
Living people
American football cornerbacks
American football safeties
Purdue Boilermakers football players
Indianapolis Colts players
Miami Dolphins players
Jacksonville Jaguars players
Detroit Lions players